The 1970 Wightman Cup was the 42nd edition of the annual women's team tennis competition between the United States and Great Britain. It was held at the All England Lawn Tennis and Croquet Club in London in England in the United Kingdom.

References

1970
1970 in tennis
1970 in women's tennis
1970 in American tennis
1970 in English women's sport
1970 sports events in London
1970 in English tennis